Joseph ben Elhanan Heilbronn was German Hebrew scholar who lived in Posen in the sixteenth century. He wrote: Em ha-Yeled, an elementary Hebrew grammar for the use of children, with conjugation tables and explanations in German (Prague, 1597); Me'irat 'Enayim, the 613 commandments arranged according to Maimonides (Prague, n.d.); and Ḳol ha-Ḳore, a short Hebrew grammar for use in schools (Cracow, n.d.).

References
 

Year of birth unknown
Year of death unknown
16th-century German Jews
16th-century German male writers
German textbook writers
Grammarians of Hebrew
Writers from Poznań